Col di Manza (Venetian language - Col de Manzha) is a hill between the towns of Colle Umberto and San Fior in the province of Treviso in Italy, facing the higher hill of Castello Roganzuolo. It is notable as the site of a villa built for the painter Titian.

Bibliography
AA.VV., Lungo le vie di Tiziano. I luoghi e le opere di Tiziano, Francesco, Orazio e Marco Vecellio tra Vittorio Veneto e il Cadore, a cura di M. Mazza, Skira, 2007.
Giuseppe Cadorin, Dello amore ai veneziani di Tiziano Vecellio, delle sue case in Cadore e in Venezia e delle vite de'suoi figli. Notizie, Venezia, Carlo Hopfener editore, 1833.
E. Svalduz, Tiziano, la casa in Col di Manza e la Pala di Castello Roganzuolo, in Studi Tizianeschi. Annuario della Fondazione Centro studi Tiziano e Cadore, Numero V, 2007, pp. 97–111.

Geography of Veneto
Hills of Italy
Province of Treviso